Orji is a given name. Notable people with the name include:

Orji Kalu (born 1992), Nigerian footballer
Orji Uzor Kalu (born 1960), Nigerian politician businessman
Orji Okwonkwo (born 1998), Nigerian footballer

See also
Orji (surname)

African given names